Melody Anderson (born December 3, 1955) is a Canadian retired actress, social worker and public speaker specializing in the impact of addiction on families. As an actress, her most high-profile role was playing Dale Arden in the 1980 adaptation of Flash Gordon. She later starred in the 1986 film Firewalker, with Chuck Norris. While singing, she also trained as an actress, leading to roles in films and television during the late 1970s and 1980s.

Early life
After high school, Anderson completed a bachelor's degree in Journalism from Carleton University in Ottawa, Ontario. Anderson served a brief stint as an on-air reporter for the Canadian Broadcasting Corporation before travelling to Southeast Asia and Australia where she worked as one of the first non-Australian female reporters working for a Sydney newspaper.

Career

Acting
Returning to North America, Anderson's first national exposure was as a guest star in the 1977 series Logan's Run and as a "Sweathog" in a 1977 episode of Welcome Back, Kotter. She made numerous guest appearances on television, including Archie Bunker's Place, Battlestar Galactica, Dallas, T. J. Hooker, CHiPs, the pilot episode of The A-Team and The Fall Guy. She had recurring roles on St. Elsewhere and Jake and the Fatman. She was the female lead of the NBC 1983 series Manimal. She was a guest star in the Murder, She Wrote episode "Prediction: Murder" in 1989.

Anderson played the female lead Dale Arden in Flash Gordon (1980) and Janet Gillis in Dead and Buried (1981). In 1983, she played the title role in a made-for-television film called Policewoman Centerfold, in which her character, a divorced police officer, is fired after posing nude for a men's magazine (based loosely on the true story of Springfield, Ohio patrolwoman Barbara Schantz, who was subsequently fired from her job after posing nude in Playboy magazine in the early 1980s).

In 1986 she appeared with Nicolas Cage in The Boy in Blue and with Chuck Norris in Firewalker. She starred in the made-for-television movie Beverly Hills Madam (1986), which starred Faye Dunaway. From 1992–93, Anderson portrayed Natalie Marlowe, and briefly her twin sister Janet Dillon, on the soap opera All My Children. She starred as Edie Adams in the television film Ernie Kovacs: Between the Laughter, opposite Jeff Goldblum as Ernie Kovacs and played the coveted role of Marilyn Monroe in the television movie Marilyn & Bobby: Her Final Affair (1993). Her last television appearance was in 1995 as a guest star in the short-lived CBS revival of Burke's Law.

Anderson has made appearances at genre conventions, such as the October 2009 Big Apple Convention in Manhattan.

Social work
Anderson is licensed in California as a Certified EMDR Clinician/EMDR Therapist.

Anderson is a LCSW (Licensed Clinical Social Worker) in the states of New York and California, with private practices in Manhattan and West Los Angeles. She also facilitates therapy groups at several treatment centers in the Los Angeles area. Anderson is an international lecturer and media spokesperson on addictions and the family. She has made presentations about substance abuse and other mental health-related areas of study.

Filmography

Film

Television

References

External links

 
 
 
 "Melody Anderson". All-American Talent & Celebrity Network.
 "Melody Anderson". Dragon Con 2016.

1955 births
Living people
Actresses from Edmonton
Canadian expatriate actresses in the United States
Canadian film actresses
Canadian people of Norwegian descent
Canadian social workers
Canadian television actresses
20th-century Canadian actresses
Canadian expatriates in Australia